The Biographical Portal (German: Biographie-Portal) is a free online index to biographical reference works in the German language area. Intended to facilitate access to reliable biographical information, it contains entries for more than 160,000 biographies of persons from all social backgrounds and nearly all periods of German, Austrian, Swiss, Slovenian and South-East European history.

The portal is a joint project of the Bavarian State Library, the Historical Committee at the Bavarian Academy of Sciences and Humanities, the Austrian Academy of Sciences, and the Foundation Historical Dictionary of Switzerland. Slovenska Biografija is published by Slovenian Academy of Sciences and Arts. The project is financed by the founding institutions and access is free.

Index
The portal provides a common index to the following reference works:
 Allgemeine Deutsche Biographie (ADB)
 Neue Deutsche Biographie (NDB)
 Österreichisches Biographisches Lexikon 1815-1950 (ÖBL)
 Historisches Lexikon der Schweiz (HLS),
 Slovenska Biografija
 Rheinland-Pfälzische Personendatenbank (RPPD)
 Sächsische Biografie (SäBi)
 Oesterreichisches Musiklexikon (OeML) 
 Biographisches Lexikon zu Geschichte Südosteuropas (BioLexSOE)

The index can be searched using the following criteria:
Surname and forename (including variant names and pseudonyms)
Year of birth and/or death
Profession

Most entries are in German. The Swiss lexicon also contains entries in French and Italian, and the Slovenska Biografija contains entries in Slovenian.

From the search results, users can access the full text of the biographies, either directly or via another site. An advantage of the common index is that it allows users to compare differences in biographical entries and supplement the information in one lexicon with that in others. Further national and regional reference works are planned for future inclusion in the portal.

Temporal coverage
All entries are for deceased persons only.  The newer German and Swiss lexicons reach into the present, but the ÖBL is limited to the period 1815–1950. The last date covered in the ÖBL is December 31, 1950, and the last biography is that of Karl Renner, first Chancellor of Austria, who died on that date.

References

External links
Biographie-Portal English language home page
Datenbank-Infosystem April 2020
/ Neue Deutsche Biographie (NDB) as part of Biographie-Portal
Biographical Portal was extended by personalities of South-East European history, Bavarian State Library, News 08/31/2017

Biographical dictionaries
Online person databases